Rudolf Voderholzer (October 9, 1959) is a prelate of the Roman Catholic Church. He is bishop of Regensburg since 2012.

Life 
Born in Munich, Voderholzer studied at the Ludwig Maximilian University of Munich where he received an MA in 1985 and a diploma in theology in 1986. He was ordained to the priesthood on June 17, 1987, by Friedrich Cardinal Wetter serving in Munich and Freising. He worked as a chaplain in Traunreut, Haar and Zorneding. In 1992 he became an assistant at the Ludwig Maximilian University of Munich to Gerhard Ludwig Müller, professor in Dogmatic theology, acquiring a doctorate in theology in 1997. In 2004 he finished his habilitation period, and that same year he started working in the department for belief- and religionsciences and philosophy at the University of Fribourg, where he was head of department from 2004 till 2005.

From 2005 till 2013 he was professor of Dogmatics and history of dogma at the theological faculty of the University of Trier.

On December 6, 2012, he was appointed bishop of Regensburg. Voderholzer received his episcopal consecration on January 26, 2013, from Reinhard Cardinal Marx, archbishop of Munich and Freising, with the former bishop of Regensburg, Gerhard Ludwig Müller; and the bishop of Plzeň, František Radkovsky, serving as co-consecrators. He chose the motto Christus in vobis spes gloriae.

In 2017, it was reported that at least 547 boys in the prestigious Domspatzen choir were physically abused, sexually abused or both between the years 1945 and 1992 and that Voderholzer announced plans to offer victims compensation of between 5,000 and 20,000 euros ($5,730 US and $22,930) each by the end of the year.

References

External links 

Entry about Rudolf Voderholzer at catholic-hierarchy.org

1959 births
21st-century German Roman Catholic bishops
21st-century Roman Catholic bishops in Germany
Roman Catholic bishops of Regensburg
Living people